Brugmans is a surname. Notable people with the surname include:

 Anton Brugmans (1732–1789), Dutch physicist
 Hendrik Brugmans (1906–1997), Dutch academic
 Sebald Justinus Brugmans (1763–1819), Dutch botanist and physician

See also
 Brugman
 Brugmann

Dutch-language surnames